The Satanic Temple, often abbreviated TST, is a nontheistic religious organization that is primarily based in the United States, with additional congregations in Canada, Australia, Finland, Germany and the United Kingdom. Co-founded by Lucien Greaves, the organization's spokesperson, and Malcolm Jarry, the organization uses Satanic imagery to promote egalitarianism, social justice, and the separation of church and state, supporting their mission "to encourage benevolence and empathy [among all people]." The Satanic Temple has utilized satire, theatrical ploys, humor, and legal action in their public campaigns to "generate attention and prompt people to reevaluate fears and perceptions", and to "highlight religious hypocrisy and encroachment on religious freedom."

The Satanic Temple does not believe in a supernatural Satan; instead it employs the literary Satan as a metaphor to promote pragmatic skepticism, rational reciprocity, personal autonomy, and curiosity. Satan is thus used as a symbol representing "the eternal rebel" against arbitrary authority and social norms. Adherents generally refer to their religion as "Satanism" or "Modern Satanism", while others refer to TST's religion as Compassionate Satanism or Seven Tenet Satanism.

The organization's participation in public affairs includes political actions as well as lobbying efforts, with a focus on exposing Christian privilege when it interferes with personal religious freedom. It considers marriage a religious sacrament that should be governed under the First Amendment's protection of religious liberty which should prevail over state laws. Because the group regards inviolability of the body as a key doctrine, it also views all restrictions on abortion, including mandatory waiting periods, as an infringement on the rights of Satanists to practice their religion.

History

Cofounders Lucien Greaves and Malcolm Jarry met in 2012, and The Satanic Temple was active by January 2013. In an interview with The New York Times, Malcolm Jarry stated that the idea of starting a Satanic faith-based organization was first conceived to meet "all the Bush administration's criteria for receiving funds, but was repugnant to them". The idea was motivated by the former president George W. Bush's formation of the White House Office of Faith-Based and Neighborhood Partnerships.

Headquarters
The Satanic Temple opened its official headquarters in Salem, Massachusetts, in 2016. The former Victorian funeral home is painted charcoal and doubles as the Salem Art Gallery.

Tax-exempt status

On April 25, 2019, the Temple announced it had received tax-exempt status from the Internal Revenue Service, being classified as a "church or a convention or association of churches." The Satanic Temple had previously been reluctant to pursue tax-exempt status until the Johnson Amendment was weakened by an executive order "Promoting Free Speech and Religious Liberty" signed by President Trump in May 2017, which TST viewed as unfairly giving higher status to religious individuals.

Announcing the new tax status co-founder Lucien Greaves stated: "In light of theocratic assaults upon the Separation of Church and State in the legislative effort to establish a codified place of privilege for one religious viewpoint, we feel that accepting religious tax exemption — rather than renouncing in protest — can help us to better assert our claims to equal access and exemption while laying to rest any suspicion that we don’t meet the qualifications of a true religious organization. Satanism is here to stay."

International stature
TST has had challenges acclimating to the diverse needs of international followers, chapters, and congregations. These difficulties largely stem from practical organization, as TST had already been struggling to meet demand for the establishment of new chapters across the United States and was structured based on the assumption of operating within the United States. To complement this, the organization was unwilling to assist members in establishing chapters where the risk of religiously motivated violence was considered too high (such as Peru and Uganda) out of concerns for their well-being. The difficulties associated with incorporating international members into the organization has led to at least one religious schism, which gave birth to another religious Satanic organization called the Global Order of Satan.

Threats against the temple 
On June 10, 2022, Daniel Lucey a resident of Chelsea, Massachusetts, lit the porch of the headquarter of the Satanic Temple in Salem, Massachusetts on fire, in an attempt to burn down the temple. The fire department was able to get the flames under control in less than two minutes after arriving to the scene. The building was occupied at the time, but everyone was evacuated and no injuries occurred. Damage was limited but several windows and porch needed to be replaced.

The Salem Police Department shared on March 2, 2023 that they had received a bomb threat for the Satanic Temple headquarters, and were taking the threat seriously and following public safety management mandates.

Mission and observances
According to the organization's website the mission of the Satanic Temple is to:

Tenets
The Satanic Temple has seven fundamental tenets:
 One should strive to act with compassion and empathy toward all creatures in accordance with reason.
 The struggle for justice is an ongoing and necessary pursuit that should prevail over laws and institutions.
 One's body is inviolable, subject to one's own will alone.
 The freedoms of others should be respected, including the freedom to offend. To willfully and unjustly encroach upon the freedoms of another is to forgo one's own.
 Beliefs should conform to one's best scientific understanding of the world. One should take care never to distort scientific facts to fit one's beliefs.
 People are fallible. If one makes a mistake, one should do one's best to rectify it and resolve any harm that might have been caused.
 Every tenet is a guiding principle designed to inspire nobility in action and thought. The spirit of compassion, wisdom, and justice should always prevail over the written or spoken word.

Holidays 
The Satanic Temple promotes five holidays.

Campaigns and initiatives

Sober Faction
The Satanic Temple Sober Faction is a peer support group that offers a Satanic approach to recovery from addiction. Sober Faction meetings assist those who are suffering from addiction in finding sobriety without including or invoking religion in the recovery process.

The Sober Faction’s method is guided by TST’s Seven Tenets and utilizes the Seven Rituals, which were crafted specifically for the Sober Faction's recovery program. The ritual process promotes self-empowerment while giving structure to each individual’s recovery journey.

The group recognizes and respects that there are multiple perspectives and multiple approaches to recovery. The group explicitly says that meetings are not a professional form of therapy, and that anyone struggling with addiction should also seek help from a medical professional.

Grey Faction
The Grey Faction is a project of The Satanic Temple with the goal of exposing malpractice and pseudoscience associated with Satanic ritual abuse conspiracy theories. The Grey Faction protests medical conferences, initiates legal action, and petitions medical boards. The faction has protested conferences held by the International Society for the Study of Trauma and Dissociation, which advocates for the discredited practice of recovered-memory therapy. The group has also petitioned for investigation into the killing by Gigi Jordan of her child, which was connected to the discredited practice of facilitated communication.

Prayer in schools
The organization first gained media attention in January 2013 after a group of Satanists assembled at the Florida State Capitol to show their approval over a bill Governor Rick Scott signed into law the prior year, Senate Bill 98, which allowed student-led prayer at school assemblies. The group further stated that as the bill did not specify a religion, the prayers could be led by a student from any religion—including Satanism. The TST members announced they "were coming out to say how happy we were because now our Satanic children could pray to Satan in school."

Pink Mass
In July 2013, The Satanic Temple held a "Pink Mass" over the grave of Catherine Johnston, the mother of Westboro Baptist Church founder Fred Phelps. The mass was held after the Westboro Baptist Church announced their intention to picket the funerals of the victims of the Boston Marathon bombing. Queerty.com suggested they had based the idea of the mass on similar activities held by factions of the Latter Day Saint movement, where they would perform proxy baptisms. The Pink Mass was officiated by Greaves and consisted of two gay men kissing over Johnston's grave while Greaves touched the tombstone with his genitals and chanted an incantation intended to change the deceased's sexual orientation. A misdemeanor charge was issued against Greaves and he was told that if he returned to Lauderdale County, Mississippi, (where Johnston's grave is located), he would be arrested. Shortly before Phelps's death on March 19, 2014, The Satanic Temple expressed interest in holding a similar ceremony for the church founder. The Blessing of same-sex marriages is allowed in The Satanic Temple.

Black Mass
In May 2014, the Temple scheduled a Black Mass to be held on the Harvard University campus, sponsored by the Harvard Extension Cultural Studies Club; the event was forced to relocate off campus due to significant opposition by Roman Catholic Archdiocese of Boston and school administrators.

Baphomet statue

A monumental bronze sculpture depicting Baphomet, the goat-headed, angel-winged occult idol, was crowdfunded in 2014 and unveiled the following year. The statue has figured prominently in challenges regarding the display of the Ten Commandments at the State Capitols of both Oklahoma and Arkansas.

Protect Children Project
Launched by The Satanic Temple in the spring of 2014, the Protect Children Project aims to offer "First Amendment protection to support children who may be at risk for being subjected to mental or physical abuse in school by teachers and administrators through the use of solitary confinement, restraints, and corporal punishment." The Protect Children Project's website asked participants to print out pre-written letters to send to their respective school boards on a day designated as "Protect Children Day" as a form of protest. In March 2017, The Satanic Temple launched an anti-spanking campaign against corporal punishment in schools, as part of the Protect Children Project. They unveiled billboards in Texas which read "Never be hit in school again. Exercise your religious rights."

Planned Parenthood counter-protests
On August 22, 2015 the Detroit chapter of The Satanic Temple held a counter-protest outside of a Ferndale Planned Parenthood location in response to anti-abortionist groups that were planning to protest Planned Parenthood on that same date. As part of the protest the Temple held a guerrilla theatre performance that included two men dressed as clergy pouring milk on kneeling actresses. This was not the first protest of this type that the Temple had held in support of the organization, as they had previously held a 2013 protest where they brought children to the Texas State Capitol who chanted "Fuck You" and "Hail Satan", while holding signs reading "Stay Out Of My Mommy's Vagina".

On April 23, 2016, members of the Detroit chapter of the Temple counter protested the Citizens for a Pro-Life Society's protest of Planned Parenthood. Temple members dressed in bondage fetish clothing, wearing baby masks and diapers while engaging in flagellation. The Temple said that the reason for the protest was to "expose the anti-choice protest as an act of fetal idolatry, highlighting the fetishization and abstraction of the 'baby.'"

Muslim refugee activism
In November 2015, the Temple received media attention for offering to take in Muslims or refugees that were afraid of experiencing backlash over the 2015 terrorist attacks in Paris.

Demonization of Junipero Serra
The Temple's Los Angeles Chapter has also protested the canonization of Junípero Serra by Pope Francis and in October 2015 they held a ceremony where they "demonized" the Christian missionary, stating that Serra helped enslave thousands of Native Americans and that he "also led The Spanish Inquisition in his territories, trying residents of the Missions for the crimes of sorcery, witchcraft and devil worship."

Pentagram ritual
On June 6, 2016, the Temple performed a pentagram ritual around the California city of Lancaster in Los Angeles County, to support California State Senate candidate Steve Hill, who hoped to be the first Satanic Temple member elected to public office.

After School Satan

After School Satan is an after school program sponsored by The Satanic Temple. It was created in July 2016 as an alternative to the Christian-based after school group called the Good News Club.

Los Angeles Satanic Mass
On January 14, 2017, a week before the Trump presidential inauguration, the Temple hosted what it billed as the largest Satanic gathering in history, hoping to double the attendance of the 2015 gathering in Detroit for the Baphomet unveiling. Film crews from VICE and NatGeo were on hand to document the event. The mass included three parts: Invocation Ritual, Destruction Ritual and a Bloodletting Ritual. Local Los Angeles media was also on hand to cover the event, calling the event "a bloody good time".

Holiday displays
Chapters throughout the United States have erected various displays to appear adjacent to Christian Nativity scenes on public grounds. A display in the Florida State Capitol rotunda in 2014 featured an angel falling from the sky into a pit of flames, which was vandalized and then modified as a result. That same year a display at the Michigan State Capitol featured the message "The Greatest Gift is Knowledge" and a depiction of a snake wrapped around a black Leviathan cross. Sponsored by the Detroit chapter, this "Snaketivity" display returned to Lansing capitol grounds in 2015, and again in 2016.

The Chicago chapter updated "Snaketivity" as a sculpture for display in the Illinois State Capitol rotunda in 2018: with a serpent coiled around a woman's hand presenting an apple, and the message "Knowledge is the Greatest Gift" inscribed on the supporting pedestal; the same sculpture returned in 2019. The West Michigan chapter installed a Yule goat outside their state's capitol on the 2019 winter solstice.

Following a pandemic hiatus on holiday displays in their State Capitol, the Illinois congregation announced a new sculpture for the rotunda in celebration of Sol Invictus 2021: Baphomet as a newborn baby. Local Catholic bishop Thomas Paprocki declined an invitation to attend the installation of the statue, which took place December 20. Illinois congregants returned to the rotunda in 2022 with a crochet display of apples and the serpent of Genesis, paired with a book by Copernicus that had been banned by the Vatican for centuries.

Scottsdale, Arizona invocation challenge
Scottsdale City Council denied a 2016 request from The Satanic Temple's Arizona chapter to give an invocation at the Council meeting; denial was based on the grounds that only groups with 'substantial connections to the community' are allowed (the pastor of First Southern Baptist Church of Scottsdale was selected instead). The Satanic Temple maintains there was never any "local community" question during the application process. The Arizona chapter's co-founder Michelle Shortt filed suit against the city, saying they had "no written policy regarding prayer and only reversed its decision after backlash from the community and city officials." The City Council unanimously approved additional funds to litigate a January 2020 federal court trial in Phoenix.
The Satanic Temple has appealed the judge's ruling.

Religious abortion ritual
Following a failed abortion lawsuit in June 2020, the Satanic Temple announced a religious abortion ritual on August 5, 2020, exempting members in RFRA states from "enduring medically unnecessary and unscientific abortion regulations when seeking to terminate their pregnancy". In September 2021, as part of its opposition to the Texas Heartbeat Act, the Satanic Temple wrote the U.S. Food and Drug Administration, saying that it had a faith-based right to access medical abortion drugs, including misoprostol and mifepristone. Temple lawyers protest a specific Texas abortion law, recently sustained by the US Supreme Court, arguing that the Temple's status as a non-theistic religious organization should ensure access to abortion as a faith-based right.

In 2022, Roe v. Wade was overturned in Dobbs v. Jackson Women's Health Organization, ending federal abortion rights and  allowing individual states to regulate their own abortion laws. Following this, the Satanic Temple commented on Twitter that the organization was "the leading beacon of light in the battle for abortion access", and that "a religious exemption [from the Satanic Temple] will be the only available challenge to many restrictions to access".

In response, Jezebel magazine critiqued the organization's position that a religious exemption would guarantee its members freedom to seek abortions even in states where they were no longer legal, criticizing its position as overly-simplistic, unproven, and put pregnant people attempting to use the Satanic Temple's religious exemption to have an abortion in legal jeopardy. Other organizations focused on reproductive rights, such as the Texas Equal Access (TEA) Fund, also commented on the Satanic Temple's position, with both the TEA Fund and the Yellowhammer Fund – an abortion fund serving the states of Alabama and Mississippi – having previously spoken out against the Satanic Temple's position. Though the Satanic Temple offers a dedicated email address for members who encounter legal problems when seeking an abortion using its religious exemption form, former TST reproductive rights spokesperson, Jex Blackmore, stated that there was "no guarantee" that the Temple would cover a member's legal fees or provide legal support. In response, the Temple's lawyer, Matthew Kezhaya, stated that part of the abortion ritual outlined by the Satanic Temple as the reason for its members' religious exemption required "consulting with your local minister", a step Jezebel noted was not mentioned on the Temple's website or either of its abortion ritual guides, and that in the case of "foreseeable legal complications", the Temple refers its members to Kezhaya "for further evaluation and discussion."

Abortion medical services
In February, 2023 TST announced it would open a medical clinic in New Mexico offering medication abortion. Operating under the name TST Health, the "Samuel Alito's Mom's Satanic Abortion Clinic" will offer free medical consultations and prescribe abortion medication, delivered by mail.

SatanCon 
On February 12, 2022, the Satanic Temple held their first SatanCon convention inside Saguaro Hotel in Scottsdale, Arizona. Outside the hotel, hundreds of Christians protested the convention holding crucifixes, crosses, and signs denouncing Satan. According to one report based on a tweet, at one point, police were forced to intervene at the protest after some Protestant and Catholic protesters started fighting against each other over their theological differences.

The Satanic Temple announced the celebration of its 10th anniversary at SatanCon 2023 from April 28-30, 2023 in downtown Boston, Massachusetts.

Bladensburg Satanic Peace Cross Ceremony
After the Supreme Court of the United States ruled that the Bladensburg Cross does not conflict with the First Amendment of the United States Constitution by honoring veterans of all faiths, The Satanic Temple interpreted the Bladensburg Peace Cross to represent Veterans who were members of The Satanic Temple as well.

To honor these Satanic Veterans, The Satanic Temple refers to the Bladensburg Peace Cross as the Bladensburg Satanic Peace Cross and held its first memorial ceremony there on 10 July, 2021.  The Bladensburg Peace Cross is significant to Satanic veterans because it is the first Satanic Monument currently erected on public property to honor their sacrifice. The Satanic Temple hopes that Bladensburg will become known internationally as a Satanic tourist destination and encourages their members to take the pilgrimage to Bladensburg to pay tribute to their fallen veterans.

Membership
Individuals dedicated to the tenets of The Satanic Temple can join on the organization's website. Members can apply to join local congregations, though local requirements may differ: "If there's a local [congregation] where you are, to join you do have to be accepted, but there's no initiation or anything. You don't even have to be a Satanist, you can just be a strong ally who believes in the political and secular actions without being super stoked about all the aesthetic aspects."

Membership is subject to termination for "failure to uphold the spirit of The Satanic Temple and its tenets." A member who used a TST event to call for violence against (then-president) Donald Trump was expelled.

Congregations
Local groups of organized TST members may form congregations. Some congregations are endorsed by TST to "participate in campaigns, social events, and other activities relevant to their local regions, as well as in concert with national TST campaigns". TST encourages members to form congregations where none exist or join pre-established ones, but does not actively establish them itself. Congregations are currently established across the continental United States, in the UK, Canada, and Australia.

Congregations were initially known as chapters; the first chapter was established in 2014 in Detroit, Michigan. That chapter went on hiatus in 2018, the same year chapters in Portland, Oregon, Los Angeles, California, and the UK seceded from the Satanic Temple over internal disputes with national leadership.

Comparison to LaVeyan Satanism
Lucien Greaves has described the Temple as being a progressive and updated version of LaVey's Satanism. The Temple views itself as separate and distinct from its forerunner, representing "a natural evolution in Satanic thought". Greaves has said that the elements of Social Darwinism and Nietzscheanism within LaVeyan Satanism are incongruent with game theory, reciprocal altruism, and cognitive science. He has also criticized the LaVeyan Church of Satan for its lack of political lobbying and what he sees as their exclusivity, referring to them as autocratic and hierarchical, and saying that the Church fetishizes authoritarianism. Conversely, the Church of Satan has made statements claiming that The Satanic Temple are only "masquerading as Satanists" and do not represent Satanism.

Reception
The Satanic Temple has received some criticism for their actions, most notably from religious organizations and figures. Many critics state that they believe that the Temple is not a serious organization and is instead meant to be a prank, form of satire, or elaborate trolling attempt. Greaves and Blackmore have both dismissed these claims, as Greaves stated in a 2013 interview with Vice that the Temple could be both satanic and satirical. Blackmore has also stated that people believe that they are only "trying to cause trouble for no reason except to just be shocking", but the Temple says they are "adding to the dialogue that's already there and asking for rights -- just like anyone else."

Both Greaves and Blackmore have stated that they have received death threats in response to their activities with The Satanic Temple.

TST has generated positive attention as well. Valerie Tarico of Salon wrote that the tenets were egalitarian and "truer to the words of Jesus than most Christians," referring to the tenets as expressing the primacy of compassion and empathy and conducive to a path to equanimity. This sentiment was echoed by Progressive Secular Humanist blogger Michael Stone who compared the tenets as superior to the Ten Commandments, claiming the tenets offer "a more moral, and more optimistic stance, emphasizing positive, pro-social values."

The organization argues that freedom of speech prevails regardless of political opinion when responding to such criticism.

The 2020 book Speak of the Devil: How the Satanic Temple Is Changing the Way We Talk About Religion is the first academic monograph to focus on the organization.

Schisms and similar groups
The Satanic Temple has inspired the development of other Satanic religious organizations: some developed amicably and others through religious schism.

The Global Order of Satan was founded in 2018 following the departure of the TST-UK and London chapters, which had voted no confidence in TST. This schism was motivated by TST removing two consecutive UK chapter heads: the first for engaging in unapproved campaigns, and the second for "personality clashes".

A group later known as HelLA formed in 2018, following a rift based on ethical concerns; the Los Angeles chapter objected to TST's acceptance of pro-bono legal work from the free speech lawyer Marc Randazza, as well as "the complete lack of racial diversity" among TST leadership. The ex-chapter head also cited a disagreement with Lucien Greaves' "absolut[ist]" philosophy on free speech.

In March 2020, several "approved administrators" of the TST-Washington chapter left the Temple and took control of the chapter's social media pages.

See also 
 Church of Satan
 Campaigns against corporal punishment
 Creation and evolution in public education
 Culture jamming
 Freedom From Religion Foundation
 Flying Spaghetti Monster

References

External links 
 
 "The Satanic Temple gets religion" on PRI's The World (6 May 2019)
 Satanic Temple TV  media platform

 
Criticism of religion
New religious movements
Religious organizations established in 2012
Religious political organizations
Satanism in the United States
Religious belief systems founded in the United States